Isla San José is the second largest island in the Pearl Islands. At the 2000 census, it had a population of only 10. Thousands of wild pigs and deer populate Isla San Jose, which has a rugged, rocky shoreline and over 50 beaches.

A unit of U.S. soldiers tested chemical arms from 1945 to 1947 on the then deserted island, leaving behind at least eight unexploded 500 and 1,000-pound bombs. A U.S. military text states that the larger bombs contained phosgene and cyanogen chloride, and smaller ones mustard gas. Other reports state that the soldiers also tested VX nerve gas and sarin. Claims of abandoned mine fields containing thousands of armed chemical mines have been made, but no evidence of this has been presented. An unknown but large amount of munitions was also dropped into the sea around the island. Earl Tupper, the inventor of Tupperware, was owner of the island.  

The island is served by San José Airport.

See also
 Air raid on Bari
 Agent Orange
 Bushnell Army Airfield
 Project 112
 Project SHAD
 Unit 516 (Japanese abandonment of weapons in China)
 Withlacoochee Army Airfield

References

 David Pugliese, "Panama: Bombs on the Beach," Bulletin of the Atomic Scientists 58 (July–August 2002)

External links
 Article of José Meléndez in Spanish newspaper El País EE UU dejó en Panamá basureros de armas químicas usadas en experimentos on 4 October 2013, retrieved on 5 October 2013.

Pacific islands of Panama
Gulf of Panama
Panamá Province
Chemical weapons
Private islands of Panama